The 2011 Nigerian Senate election in Plateau State was held on April 9, 2011, to elect members of the Nigerian Senate to represent Plateau State. Victor Lar representing Plateau South and Gyang Dalyop Datong representing Plateau North won on the platform of Peoples Democratic Party, while Joshua Dariye representing Pleateau Central won on the platform of Labour Party.

Overview

Summary

Results

Plateau South 
Peoples Democratic Party candidate Victor Lar won the election, defeating other party candidates.

Plateau North 
Peoples Democratic Party candidate Gyang Dalyop Datong won the election, defeating other party candidates.

Pleateau Central 
Labour Party candidate Joshua Dariye won the election, defeating other party candidates.

References 

Plateau State Senate elections
Plateau State senatorial elections
Plateau State senatorial elections